James McKay Harding (January 4, 1926 – January 23, 1995) was a political figure in Nova Scotia, Canada. He represented Shelburne County in the Nova Scotia House of Assembly from 1956 to 1970 as a Progressive Conservative member.

References

1926 births
1995 deaths
Progressive Conservative Association of Nova Scotia MLAs
People from Shelburne County, Nova Scotia